Kōiki-kōen-mae Station is a HRT terminal station on Astram Line, located in 4-4-8, Ozuka-nishi, Asaminami-ku, Hiroshima. The station services the Big Arch Stadium.

Platforms

Connections
█ Astram Line
●Ōzuka — ●Kōiki-kōen-mae

Around station

Hiroshima Kouiki Kouen
Hiroshima Big Arch
Hiroshima Shudo University
Hiroshima Seifu-shinto

History
Opened on August 20, 1994.

See also
Astram Line
Hiroshima Rapid Transit
Sanfrecce Hiroshima

References

Astram Line stations